James Robson (23 January 1939 – 14 December 2021) was an English professional footballer who played as an inside forward. He played over 450 matches in the Football League.

Robson won the First Division with Burnley in 1960, beating Manchester City in the final game of the season to win the title.

In the 1962 FA Cup Final, Robson's goal against Tottenham Hotspur to make it 1–1 was the 100th goal ever scored in an FA Cup final at Wembley. Burnley lost 3–1. Robson did score another goal but it was ruled off-side.

On 27 April 1966, Robson became the first Blackpool substitute to score a goal. It came in a 2–1 defeat at Manchester United.

After developing Alzheimer's disease, Robson died on 14 December 2021, at the age of 82.

Honours
Burnley
 Football League First Division: 1959–60
 FA Cup runner-up: 1962

References
Specific

General

1939 births
2021 deaths
People from Pelton, County Durham
Footballers from County Durham
English footballers
England under-23 international footballers
Association football forwards
Burnley F.C. players
Blackpool F.C. players
Barnsley F.C. players
Bury F.C. players
English Football League players
Rochdale A.F.C. non-playing staff
Burnley F.C. non-playing staff
Huddersfield Town A.F.C. non-playing staff
FA Cup Final players
Deaths from dementia in the United Kingdom
Deaths from Alzheimer's disease